Scarborough is a coastal suburb of Perth, Western Australia, located approximately 14 km northwest of the city centre in the City of Stirling local government area. Located along the coast of the Indian Ocean, it was named after the English beach resort Scarborough, North Yorkshire.

It has a population of about 14,300 people (2011 census), of whom about 25% were born overseas, mostly in the United Kingdom. It has a landmark high-rise hotel, the Rendezvous Hotel Perth Scarborough, originally built as Observation City in 1986 for Alan Bond, in anticipation of a demand for accommodation when the 1987 America's Cup challenge was held at nearby Fremantle. Scarborough Beach was the venue for the Australian Surf Life Saving Championships for the years 2007, 2008, 2009 and 2014.

Scarborough Beach 
Scarborough Beach is an entertainment precinct within the suburb with restaurants, bars and a nightclub. Since 1999, the local council has deployed a strategy for issues including traffic, parking, zoning, coastal landscape and recreation.

One of the issues was whether or not to allow further high-rise development on Scarborough Beach. The 24-level Observation City hotel development (now Rendezvous) was very controversial in the 1980s but proceeded despite a long and intense public campaign against high-rise beachfront development. Perth businessman Alan Bond, who built Observation City, had ambitious plans to convert the entire Scarborough Beach "strip". After securing most of the real estate, his plans failed to proceed to because he was unable to purchase the family-owned fast food restaurant Peter's by the Sea. The restaurant still exists today after it refused to sell despite Bond making inflated offers on the property, and it has taken on historical significance with the locals ever since. Subsequent amendments by the City of Stirling have specified a height limit of eight storeys. 

In April 2019, the ocean-side Scarborough Beach Pool opened.

Education

The only school in Scarborough is Scarborough Primary School.

The Japanese School in Perth was previously located in Scarborough.

Politics

References

External links
 Informational site with links to local businesses and photographs
 Perth's Observation City Hotel Past Its Prime 4 June 2007 news item at Hotelchatter.com

Suburbs of Perth, Western Australia
Surfing locations in Western Australia
Suburbs in the City of Stirling